When You Least Expect It is a Spanish dramedy television series created by Cristóbal Garrido and Adolfo Valor which stars Blanca Portillo alongside Francesc Orella, Marta Hazas, Erick Elías, and Alba Planas. It premiered on Amazon Prime Video on 22 April 2022.

Plot 
Four strangers from different backgrounds (Pardo, Luis, Graci and Sara) meet in a group therapy session led by Dr. Laforet to find a way to move forward with their lives.

Cast

Production 
Created by Cristóbal Garrido and Adolfo Valor, the series was produced by VIS and Zeta Studios. , Arantxa Echevarría, and  took over direction duties. It consists of 10 episodes.

Release 
Distributed by Amazon Prime Video, the series premiered in Spain on 22 April 2022. The series was released in the United States by Paramount+ in August 2022.

Accolades 

|-
| align = "center" | 2022 || 24th Iris Awards || Best Actress || Blanca Portillo ||  || align = "center" | 
|}

References

2022 Spanish television series debuts
2020s Spanish drama television series
2020s Spanish comedy television series
Spanish-language television shows
Spanish comedy-drama television series
Spanish-language Amazon Prime Video original programming